Ioakim Beniskos (born 28 September 1981) is a retired Greek football striker.

References

1981 births
Living people
Greek footballers
Agrotikos Asteras F.C. players
Aris Thessaloniki F.C. players
Ethnikos Asteras F.C. players
Thrasyvoulos F.C. players
PAS Lamia 1964 players
Naoussa F.C. players
Association football forwards
Super League Greece players
Footballers from Thessaloniki